Marla is a town and locality in the Australian state of South Australia located in the state's north-west about  north-west of the state capital of Adelaide and about  south of the town of Alice Springs in the Northern Territory.

History
Marla was constituted as a government town under the Crown Lands Act 1929-1980 on 21 May 1981 and was gazetted as a locality under the Geographical Names Act 1991 on 8 February 2001 with the assigned boundaries being similar to that of the government town. The name is derived from the Marla Bore which is located to west of Marla and whose name is reported as being ultimately "a corruption of the Aboriginal marlu – 'a kangaroo'".

Geoffrey H. Manning, the South Australian historian, reports that the town was proclaimed as a place for "the provision of essential services to travellers crossing the continent"  and to act as an administrative centre for the north-west part of the state including the Anangu Pitjantjatjara Yankunytjatjara lands and the Mintabie Opal Field to the town's west.

Transport

The Stuart Highway passes through the south-west side of Marla while the alignment of the Adelaide-Darwin railway is located outside of its boundaries on the south-west side of the highway. While a site is designated as a railway station with the name Marla Siding on the south side of the railway, it is not a scheduled stop for rail services such as The Ghan as of 2018 for Marla and adjoining localities. However the northbound Ghan stops outside Marla for a morning breakfast experience.

Facilities

The town includes a health centre "Marla Clinic" operated on behalf of the state government by the Royal Flying Doctor Service of Australia, a regional police station and a privately owned complex called the Marla Travellers Rest which is described as consisting of "roadhouse, hotel and motel, restaurant, service station, supermarket, caravan park and much more." it also is an agent for Australia Post LPO.

Population

At the 2016 census, Marla had a population of 100.

Aerodrome

Governance
Marla is located within the federal division of Grey, the state electoral district of Giles, the Pastoral Unincorporated Area of South Australia and the state government region of the Far North. As of 2018, the community within Marla received municipal services from a South Australian government agency, the Outback Communities Authority.

Weather station

The Marla Police Station has been the site of an official weather station since 1985.

References

Towns in South Australia
Far North (South Australia)
Places in the unincorporated areas of South Australia